This is a list of macOS built-in apps and system components.

Applications

App Store

The Mac App Store is macOS's digital distribution platform for macOS apps, created and maintained by Apple Inc. based on the iOS version, the platform was announced on October 20, 2010, at Apple's "Back to the Mac" event. First launched on January 6, 2011, as part of the free Mac OS X 10.6.6 update for all current Snow Leopard users, Apple began accepting app submissions from registered developers on November 3, 2010, in preparation for its launch. After 24 hours of release, Apple announced that there were over one million downloads.

Automator

Automator is an app used to create workflows for automating repetitive tasks into batches for quicker alteration via point-and-click (or drag and drop). This saves time and effort over human intervention to manually change each file separately. Automator enables the repetition of tasks across a wide variety of programs, including Finder, Safari, Calendar, Contacts and others. It can also work with third-party applications such as Microsoft Office, Adobe Photoshop or Pixelmator. The icon features a robot holding a pipe, a reference to pipelines, a computer science term for connected data workflows. Automator was first released with Mac OS X Tiger (10.4).

Books

Apple Books was first released in OS X Mavericks.

Calculator

Calculator is a basic calculator application made by Apple Inc. and bundled with macOS. It has three modes: basic, scientific, and programmer. Basic includes a number pad, buttons for adding, subtracting, multiplying, and dividing, as well as memory keys. Scientific mode supports exponents and trigonometric functions, and programmer mode gives the user access to more options related to computer programming.

The Calculator program has a long history going back to the very beginning of the Macintosh platform, where a simple four-function calculator program was a standard desk accessory from the earliest system versions. Though no higher math capability was included, third-party developers provided upgrades, and Apple released the Graphing Calculator application with the first PowerPC release (7.1.2) of the Mac OS, and it was a standard component through Mac OS 9. Apple currently ships a different application called Grapher.

Calculator has Reverse Polish notation support, and can also speak the buttons pressed and result returned.

The Calculator appeared first as a desk accessory in first version of Macintosh System for the 1984 Macintosh 128k. Its original incarnation was developed by Chris Espinosa and its appearance was designed, in part, by Steve Jobs when Espinosa, flustered by Jobs's dissatisfaction with all of his prototype designs, conceived an application called The Steve Jobs Roll Your Own Calculator Construction Set that allowed Jobs to tailor the look of the calculator to his liking. Its design was maintained with the same basic math operations until the final release of classic Mac OS in 2002.

A Dashboard Calculator widget is included in all versions of macOS from Mac OS X Tiger onwards. It only has the basic mode of its desktop counterpart. Since the release of OS X Yosemite, there is also a simple calculator widget available in the notifications area.

Since the release of Mac OS X Leopard, simple arithmetic functions can be calculated from Spotlight feature. They include the standard addition, subtraction, division, multiplication, exponentiation and the use of the percent sign to denote percentage.

Calendar

Calendar is a personal calendar app made by Apple Inc. that runs on both the macOS desktop operating system and the iOS mobile operating system. It offers online cloud backup of calendars using Apple's iCloud service, or can synchronize with other calendar services, including Google Calendar and Microsoft Exchange Server.

Chess

Apple Chess is a 3D chess game for macOS, developed by Apple Inc. as a fork of GNOME Chess (formerly "glChess"). Its history dates back to OpenStep and Mac OS X 10.2. It supports chess variants such as crazyhouse and suicide chess. Apple redistributes the source code under its own Apple Sample Code License, after a special permission has been granted from the original authors of GNOME Chess (which is licensed under GPL3). Apple ships with the game also the Sjeng chess engine (GPL).

Contacts

Contacts, called Address Book before OS X Mountain Lion, is a computerized address book included with Apple Inc.'s macOS. It includes various synchronizing capabilities and integrates with other macOS applications and features.

Dictionary

Dictionary is an application that includes an in-built dictionary and thesaurus.

FaceTime

FaceTime is a video calling app released by Apple to replace iChat on Mac.

Find My

First available in macOS Catalina, it tracks location of compatible devices connected via iCloud.

Font Book

Home

Home is the front-end for Apple's HomeKit software framework providing integration with other smart devices.

Image Capture

Image Capture is an application program from Apple that enables users to upload pictures from digital cameras or scanners which are either connected directly to the computer or the network. It provides no organizational tools like iPhoto but is useful for collating pictures from a variety of sources with no need for drivers.

Image Capture is scriptable with AppleScript, and may be manipulated with Tiger's Automator application. As of Tiger, Image Capture's AppleScript dictionary does not open in Script Editor. As of Snow Leopard only the Image Capture Web Server opens in Script Editor.

Launchpad

Launchpad is an application launcher that was first introduced in OS X Lion. It displays all applications installed on the user's machine in a grid of icons, which can be put into folders. Launchpad provides an alternative way to start applications in macOS, in addition to other options such as the Dock, Finder, and Spotlight search. Launchpad can be used to uninstall apps that came from the Mac App Store.

Mail

Maps

Apple Maps is a map service released by Apple.

Messages

Messages was released to replace iChat on Mac.

Mission Control

Music

News

Apple News is a digital news platform released by Apple.

Notes

Notes is macOS's notetaking app. It had first been introduced to macOS starting with OS X Mountain Lion, after first being developed for iOS. It serves as a local note-taking application, as well as allowing sharing via iCloud or other cloud services.

Photo Booth

Photo Booth is a camera application for macOS. It utilizes the front iSight camera to take pictures and videos.

Photos

Photos is a photo management and editing application that was designed based on the in-built app released for iOS 8. On macOS, Photos was first introduced to OS X Yosemite users in the 10.10.3 update on April 8, 2015, replacing iPhoto.

Podcasts

Preview

QuickTime Player

The QuickTime player is an application that can play video and sound files.

Reminders

Task-managing app introduced to OS X 10.8 Mountain Lion and iOS 5.

Safari

Safari is the default web browser included with macOS since version 10.3 "Panther", where it replaces Internet Explorer for Mac OS X. It uses the WebKit browser engine.

Shortcuts

Shortcuts is a visual scripting application.

Siri

Introduced in macOS 10.12, Siri is a digital assistant that allows the user to interact with it to ask questions, make recommendations, and perform actions on the device. It had been previously included in iOS.

Stickies

Stocks
Stocks is an application that provides information regarding stocks of various companies around the world.

System Settings

TV

TextEdit

Time Machine

Time Machine is an application where the user can back up their files.

Voice Memos
Voice Memos, introduced in macOS Mojave, is a basic application with the capability of recording audio. In addition to this, it allows several editing functions, such as trimming and overwriting.

Utilities

Activity Monitor

Activity Monitor is a system monitor for the macOS operating system, which also incorporates task manager functionality. Activity Monitor appeared in Mac OS X v10.3, when it subsumed the functionality of the programs Process Viewer (a task manager) and CPU Monitor found in the previous version of OS X. In OS X 10.9, Activity Monitor was significantly revamped and gained a fifth tab for "energy" (in addition to CPU, memory, disk, and network).

AirPort Utility
AirPort Utility is a program that allows users to configure an AirPort wireless network and manage services associated with and devices connected to AirPort Routers. It comes pre-installed on macOS, and is available to download for Microsoft Windows and iOS. AirPort Utility is unique in that it offers network configuration in a native application as opposed to a web application. It provides a graphical overview of AirPort devices attached to a network, and provides tools to manage each one individually. It allows users to configure their network preferences, assign Back to My Mac accounts to the network, and configure USB attached Printers and hard drives. The current versions are 6.3.6 for recent versions of macOS, 5.6.1 for Microsoft Windows and older versions of Mac OS X, and 1.3.4 for iOS.

On January 30, 2013, Apple released AirPort Utility 6.0 for macOS featuring a redesign of the user interface focused on increasing usability for novice users. Reception was mixed with some media outlets reporting IT professionals and network administrators being frustrated over some removed features. It was reported that most end users, however, wouldn't notice the feature omissions. Users requiring the removed features can still access the previous version of AirPort Utility using a workaround.

Audio MIDI Setup
The Audio MIDI Setup utility is a program that comes with the macOS operating system for adjusting the computer's audio input and output configuration settings and managing MIDI devices.

It was first introduced in Mac OS X 10.5 Leopard as a simplified way to configure MIDI Devices. Users need to be aware that prior to this release, MIDI devices did not require this step, and it mention of it might be omitted from MIDI devices from third-party manufactures.

Bluetooth File Exchange
Bluetooth File Exchange is a utility that comes with the macOS operating system, used to exchange files to or from a Bluetooth-enabled device. For example, it could be used to send an image to a cellphone, or to receive an image or other documents from a PDA.

Boot Camp Assistant

Boot Camp Assistant assists users with installing Windows on their Mac using Boot Camp. It does not support Macs with Apple silicon processors, as Windows 10 does not have a commercial version of Windows 10 that runs on ARM based processors.

ColorSync Utility
ColorSync Utility is a macOS application used for management of color profiles and filters used in Apple's PDF workflows, or applying filters to PDF documents.

The interface is composed of two parts, the document browser and the utility window. The document browser allows the user to zoom in and out of an image or apply a Filter to it. The utility window has several options, including Profile First Aid, Profiles, Devices, Filters and Calculator.

 Profile First Aid allows the user to repair ColorSync color profiles so they conform to the International Color Consortium specification.
 Profiles allows the user to browse the profiles installed on the system, grouped by location, class or space, and graphically compare any two profiles. The profile map is displayed as a rotatable, scalable 3D object and can be plotted in CIELAB, CIELUV, YXY, YUV and CIEXYZ.
 The Devices section allows the user to see a list of all registered ColorSync devices such as displays and printers, and see what ColorSync profile is applied to each one. It is also possible to override the default setting.
 The Filters section allows the user to build and modify PDF filters that are available to the rest of the operating system. Each filter can be set to appear in one of three domains: Application, PDF Workflows, and Printing.

Filters set to Printing will appear in the drop-down menu under the "Save as PDF..." button in the standard Mac OS X print dialog box. Filters set to PDF Workflow will appear in the Quartz Filters drop-down menu in the ColorSync section of a print dialog box. The default filters are:

 Black & White
 Blue Tone
 Create Generic PDFX-3 Document
 Gray Tone
 Lightness Decrease
 Lightness Increase
 Reduce File Size
 Sepia Tone

User-created filters can have color management, image effects, PDF retouch, domain selection and comments.

The Color Management section allows assigning a profile, choosing a default profile, rendering intent, converting to a profile or intermediate transform.

The Intermediate Transform section allows adjustment of brightness, tint, hue, saturation, bilevel (high pass filter) or profile assignment, to either grayscale, RGB or CMYK, or all data in the file. This can be applied to either text, graphics, images or shading.

Complex filters can be created by stacking multiple effects. Any changes made to the PDF file can then be saved as a new PDF file.

Calculator can convert between RGB, CMYK and other color value schemes, and features an interactive color-picker for identifying a color on the screen, duplicating a feature of another bundled utility, Digital Color Meter.

ColorSync 
ColorSync is Apple Inc.'s color management API for the Classic Mac OS and macOS. Apple developed the original 1.0 version of ColorSync as a Mac-only architecture, which made it into an operating system release in 1993. In the same year, Apple co-founded the International Color Consortium (ICC) to develop a cross-platform profile format which became part of ColorSync 2.0. The system Color Management Module (CMM) was "LinoColorCMM", which was developed by Linotype-Hell AG (now part of Heidelberger Druckmaschinen AG). The same CMM was used in Microsoft Windows 2000 and XP under the rubric of "Image Color Management" (ICM). Apple, with the help of Adobe had ported ColorSync 2.0 and its SDK to Microsoft Windows. With ColorSync 3.0, the Windows version which was initially planned was discontinued. ColorSync 4.0 is the latest version, introduced in Mac OS X 10.1.

To deal with color gamut issues, ColorSync provides several different methods of doing color matching. For instance, perceptual matching tries to preserve as closely as possible the relative relationships between colors, even if all the colors must be systematically distorted in order to get them to fit within the gamut of the destination device. Because the human eye is more sensitive to color differences rather than absolute colors, this method tends to produce the best-looking results, subjectively speaking, for many common uses, but there are other methods that work better in some cases. (This set of rendering intents is part of the ICC system, and is available on all systems with ICC.)

As dictated by the ICC system, the profile connection space in ColorSync is the CIE XYZ color space. All image input and output devices (scanners, printers, displays) have to be characterized by providing an ICC profile that defines how their color information is to be interpreted relative to this reference color space. This profile might be provided by the device manufacturer, but for better quality results, it might be generated by performing actual measurements on the device with a colorimeter. Thus, when an image is scanned on a scanner, the image file will include a copy of the scanner's profile to characterize the meaning of its color information. Then, before the image is sent to an output device, a matching process converts the color information at the time of rendering from the source profile (that attached to the image) to the destination profile (that attached to the output device) so that the resulting colors print or display as closely as possible to the original image.

Console
Console is a log viewer developed by Apple Inc. and included with macOS. It allows users to search through all of the system's logged messages, and can alert the user when certain types of messages are logged. The Console is generally used for troubleshooting when there is a problem with the computer. macOS itself, as well as any applications that are used, send a constant stream of messages to the system in the form of log files. The console allows users to read the system logs, help find certain ones, monitor them, and filter their contents.

Clicking on "Show Log List" in the toolbar will bring up the Log List. The Log List opens a sidebar which shows all of the different logs that the system maintains. This list helps in viewing the many different logs maintained in various parts of the system by bringing them all together to one place. By clicking on a particular log category, all of the logs will be shown.

The System Log Queries contains all of the logs that have to do with the entire system. This includes system logs as well as individual application logs.

Selecting All Messages gives a live look at your computer's activities, updated live. This includes all activities from both the system as well as any applications running. Logs in this section of the Console are all formatted uniformly. They all include a timestamp, the name of the process or application, and the actual message of the log. When the message displayed includes a paperclip icon next to it, it means that it is a shortened version of a longer report, and clicking the icon will show the complete report.

In addition to viewing all messages, users can also create custom queries with any criteria that they like. These custom queries will filter the messages and will also be shown in the All Messages section. In order to make a new query, choose "New System Log Query" from the File menu.

Digital Color Meter

Digital Color Meter is a utility for measuring and displaying the color values of pixels displayed on the screen of a Macintosh computer.

The utility presents a "window" onto the screen which includes a cursor which by default is 1 × 1 pixel in size. The color displayed in that pixel is shown as a color value which may be represented as decimal or hexadecimal RGB triplets, CIE 1931, CIE 1976 or CIELAB triplets or a Tristimulus triplet.

The displayed color could be copied either as a solid color or as the color value which represents it, to be used in other applications (for instance an RGB triplet may be used in a color specification to be used on a World Wide Web page).

Disk Utility

Grapher

Keychain Access

Migration Assistant

Migration Assistant is a utility by Apple Inc. that transfers data, user accounts, computer settings and apps from one Macintosh computer to another computer, or from a full drive backup. As of OS X Lion and later, it can also migrate contacts, calendars, and email accounts and other files from Microsoft Windows. Migration Assistant can be used during initial setup of a new computer or run manually on a system that has already been set up. It may be used multiple times to copy only applications, user account(s), or settings. Its primary purpose is to duplicate the contents and configuration of an existing computer user account(s) on a new one.

The Migration Assistant does not transfer the operating system of the old computer to the new one. Similarly, applications  and utilities bundled by Apple with the operating system (e.g. Safari) are not transferred, based on the assumption that the newer machine has the same or newer version already installed. However, settings for these applications (e.g. bookmarks) are transferred.

Screenshot
Available in macOS Mojave (10.14) and above, the Screenshot app bundles features such as screen recording and taking screenshots.

Script Editor

System Information

System Information (previously known as System Profiler) is a software utility derived from field service diagnostics produced by Apple's Service Diagnostic Engineering team, at that time located in Apple satellite buildings in Campbell, California, that was bundled with the classic Mac OS since Mac OS 7.6 under the name Apple System Profiler.  In Mac OS X 10.0, the first release of macOS, it was renamed System Profiler; with the release of Mac OS X 10.7 "Lion" it was again renamed to System Information. Other new features in Lion are the ability to look up support information for the user's hardware model as well. In OS X Mountain Lion and later versions of macOS users can also access System Information by holding down the option key and "System Information" will replace "About This Mac" in the Apple Menu.

It compiles technical information on all of the installed hardware, devices, drivers, applications, system settings, system software programs and kernel extensions installed on the host computer. It can export this information as plain text, RTF or in the plist XML format. This information is used to diagnose problems. System Profiler can be extremely useful if attempting to diagnose a hardware problem. A user can send the information directly to Apple if the user desires. It has support for scripting automation through AppleScript and some limited support in Automator.

System Information can also be accessed by using the "system_profiler" command through macOS's Terminal application.

Terminal

Terminal (Terminal.app) is the terminal emulator included in macOS. Terminal originated in NeXTSTEP and OPENSTEP, the predecessor operating systems of macOS.

As a terminal emulator, the application provides text-based access to the operating system, in contrast to the mostly graphical nature of the user experience of macOS, by providing a command-line interface to the operating system when used in conjunction with a Unix shell, such as zsh (the default shell in macOS Catalina). The user can choose other shells available with macOS, such as the KornShell, tcsh, and bash.

VoiceOver Utility

VoiceOver is an application where the user can listen to spoken descriptions on the computer.

Features

Control Center
Control Center provides access to system controls, such as Wi-Fi, Bluetooth, and Sound, in a unified interface accessible from the menu bar. Some of these controls can be added to the menu bar by dragging them from Control Center. Additional components can be added in System Settings. Available controls include:

 Wi-Fi
 Bluetooth
 AirDrop
 Focus
 Stage Manager
 Keyboard Brightness (available on Mac notebooks)
 Screen Mirroring
 Display
 Sound
 Now Playing
 Accessibility Shortcuts
 Battery (available on Mac notebooks)
 Fast User Switching

Dock

The Dock is the main method of launching applications on macOS.

Finder

Finder is the default file manager and graphical interface shell of macOS.

Notification Center

Notification Center displays notifications from apps and websites. Users access Notification Center by clicking the clock in the menu bar on macOS Big Sur or the Notification Center icon in earlier versions of macOS. Notification Center can be customized in System Settings.

Spotlight

Spotlight is macOS's selection-based search system, used for indexing documents, pictures, music, applications, and System Settings within the computer.

Accessibility

Dwell Control
Dwell allows the pointer to be controlled using head or eye tracking technologies. A user can also trigger actions by dwelling or holding the pointer still for a specified amount of time which will trigger the programmed dwell actions.

VoiceOver

System components

Archive Utility
Archive Utility (BOMArchiveHelper until Mac OS X 10.5) is the default archive file handler in macOS. It is usually invoked automatically when opening a file in one of its supported formats. It can be used to create compressed ZIP archives by choosing "Create archive of 'file'" (Leopard: "Compress") in the Finder's File or contextual menu. It is located at /System/Library/CoreServices/Applications/Archive Utility.app in OS X 10.10 and later, /System/Library/CoreServices/Archive Utility.app in 10.5 through 10.9, and /System/Library/CoreServices/BOMArchiveHelper.app in 10.4 Prior to Archive Utility's inclusion in Mac OS X v10.3, beginning with Mac OS 7.6, Apple bundled the freeware StuffIt Expander with the operating system.

Invoking Archive Utility manually shows a minimal GUI letting the user change Archive Utility preferences or choose files to compress or uncompress.

BOM is an abbreviation of Bill of Materials. Bill of Materials files or .bom files are used by the macOS Installer program to document where files in an installer bundle are installed, what their file permissions should be, and other file metadata. Thus, a Bill of Materials is read by the Installer, and Archive Utility helps it by extracting the files specified in the BOM.

Crash Reporter
Crash Reporter is the standard crash reporter in macOS. Crash Reporter can send the crash logs to Apple Inc. for their engineers to review.

Crash Reporter has three modes of operations:

Basic — The default mode. Only application crashes are reported, and the dialog does not contain any debugging information.
Developer — In addition to application crashes, crashes are also displayed for background and system processes.
Server — The default for macOS Server systems. No crash reports are shown to the user (though they are still logged).
None — Disables the dialog prompt. Crash reports are neither displayed nor logged.

The developer tool CrashReporterPrefs can be used to change modes, as can using the terminal command defaults write com.apple.CrashReporter DialogType [basic|developer|server].

In basic mode, if Crash Reporter notices an application has crashed twice in succession, it will offer to rename the application's preference file and try again (corrupted preference files being a common cause of crashes).

When reporting a crash, the top text field of the window has the crash log, while the bottom field is for user comments. Users may also copy and paste the log into their e-mail client to send to a third-party application developer for the developer to use.

DiskImageMounter 
DiskImageMounter is the utility that handles mounting disk volume images in Mac OS X, starting with version 10.3. DiskImageMounter works by either launching a daemon to handle the disk image or by contacting a running daemon and have it mount the disk.

Like BOMArchiveHelper, DiskImageMounter has no GUI when double-clicked; doing so does nothing. The only GUI the program ever displays is a window with a progress bar and mount options (cancel or skip verification) or an error report if it could not mount the image. It is found in /System/Library/CoreServices/DiskImageMounter.app.

Starting with version 10.7, Apple "removed double-click support for images using legacy metadata." DiskImageMounter will not be able to open .img (NDIF only), .smi (self mounting), .dc42 (Disk Copy 4.2), and .dart (DART) disk image formats that was previously supported in version 10.6 and earlier.

DiskImageMounter supports a variety of disk image file types:

 Apple Disk Image (.dmg, com.apple.disk-image)
 UDIF disk images (.udif, com.apple.disk-image-udif); UDIF segment (.devs, .dmgpart, com.apple.disk-image-udif-segment)
 self mounting image (.smi, com.apple.disk-image-smi)
 DVD/CD-R master image (.toast, .dvdr, .cdr, com.apple.disk-image-cdr, com.roxio.disk-image-toast)
 disk image segment (dmgpart)
 raw disk image (OSTypes: devr, hdrv, DDim, com.apple.disk-image-raw)
 PC drive container (OSTypes: OPCD, com.apple.disk-image-pc)
 ISO image (.iso, public.iso-image)
 sparse disk image (.sparseimage, com.apple.disk-image-sparse, .sparsebundle)

As of macOS 11.0, support for the following formats has been removed:

 Disk Copy 4.2 disk image (.dc42, .diskcopy42, com.apple.disk-image-dc42)
 DART disk image (.dart, com.apple.disk-image-dart)
 NDIF disk image (.ndif, .img, com.apple.disk-image-ndif); NDIF disk image segment (.imgpart, com.apple.disk-image-ndif-segment)

Directory Utility
Directory Utility is a utility included with the macOS (previously Mac OS X) operating system to configure connections to directory services. Prior to Mac OS X 10.5, this tool was named Directory Access. Apple's LDAP implementation is called Apple Open Directory.

DVD Player
DVD Player (formerly Apple DVD Player) is the default DVD player in macOS. It supports all the standard DVD features such as multiple audio, video & subtitle tracks as well as Dolby Digital 5.1 passthrough, DVD access URLs and closed captions. In some instances, users can choose which VOB file to open. DVD Player is also fully compatible with DVDs authored by DVD Studio Pro and iDVD, including HD DVDs by DVD Studio Pro. As of macOS Mojave, it has been updated to 64-bit, sports a new icon and has better Touch Bar support.

DVD Player complies with most copyright laws, and will thus enforce most restrictive measures of DVD technology, such as region-restrictive encodings and user-inhibited operations ("disabled actions"). It does this even when using an all-region DVD drive. It will even force Apple's Grab (screen-grabbing) program to cease functioning through the Finder interface until the DVD Player application is quit, effectively preventing the user from taking screen captures of visual DVD content.

The software does not contain a DTS decoder, so DTS tracks cannot be played through the Mac's built in speakers or analog output. However, DTS tracks can be output to devices that have their own decoder, so playback is supported through outputs such as S/PDIF, DisplayPort and HDMI. It has never supported the ability to play Blu-Ray discs.

Expansion Slot Utility
Expansion Slot Utility allows manual allocation of PCIe card bandwidth. It is only available on certain Mac Pro models.

Feedback Assistant
The Feedback Assistant is made available to customers in the Apple Software Customer Seeding, AppleSeed for IT or Apple Beta Software programs and allows a user to manually send feedback, reports, or requests to Apple.

HelpViewer

Help Viewer is a WebKit based HTML viewer for macOS aimed at displaying help files and other documentation. The default file extension is ".help". Help index files are generated with Help Indexer. macOS applications typically use Help Viewer to display their help content, rather than a custom system.

Help Viewer's implementation in Mac OS X 10.5 (Leopard) found its way to Rob Griffiths' list of Leopard criticisms, because Apple changed the software from a standalone application with a standard window interface to one with a floating window that always appears in front of all other application windows, obscuring the interface for which one is seeking help (see image below).

Although one can close or minimize the Help Viewer window, it is difficult to consult the Help Viewer while simultaneously working with the application, short of changing the size of windows so both fit on the screen. The Help Viewer window also does not work with the Exposé window management feature (Mission Control in OS X 10.7 or later).  There is a workaround using the defaults command accessible in the Terminal.

iOS App Installer
iOS App Installer is an app that downloads .ipa files for iPadOS applications so that they can be run on Apple silicon-based Macs.

Installer

Installer extracts and installs files out of .pkg packages, allowing developers to create uniform software installers.

Installer launches when a package or metapackage file is opened. The installation process itself can vary substantially, as Installer allows developers to customize the information the user is presented with. For example, it can be made to display a custom welcome message, software license and readme.  Installer also handles authentication, checks that packages are valid before installing them, and allows developers to run custom scripts at several points during the installation process.

Installer packages have the file extension . Prior to Mac OS X Leopard, installer packages were implemented as Mac OS X packages. These packages were a collection of files that resided in folders with a .pkg file extension. In Mac OS X Leopard the software packaging method was changed to use the XAR (eXtensible ARchiver) file format; the directory tree containing the files is packaged as an xar archive file with a  extension. Instead of distributing multiple files for a package, this allowed all of the software files to be contained in a single file for easier distribution with the benefit of package signing.

loginwindow
The loginwindow process displays the macOS login window at system startup if auto-login is not set, verifies login attempts, and launches login applications. It also implements the Force Quit window, restarts macOS user interface components (the Dock and Finder) if they crash, and handles the logout, restart, and shutdown routines.

Users are assigned their own loginwindow when they log in; if a loginwindow process belonging to a specific user is force quit, they will be logged out.

Screen Sharing
Screen Sharing is a utility that may be used to control remote computers and access their files. To connect, one may enter a VNC or Apple ID and authenticate as a local user on the remote computer, or, if the computers are linked via the same Apple ID, automatically initialise the connection. It supports features such as a shared clipboard between the two computers and remotely transferring files.
The feature must be enabled in the Sharing preference pane in System Settings.

Software Update
Software Update is a section in System Settings for Mac Software Updates, as well as updates to core Mac apps, starting in macOS Mojave (10.14); it also has an item in the Apple menu. From OS X Mountain Lion (10.8) to macOS High Sierra (10.13), the Mac App Store was used for Software Updates; prior to that, Software Update was a separate utility, which could be launched from the Apple menu or from the Software Update pane in System Settings.

Other 
Other system components include:

 About This Mac, which shows information about the Mac it is running on, such as the hardware, serial number, and macOS version.
 Captive Network Assistant, a daemon used to access captive portals when connected to public Wi-Fi networks.
 Certificate Assistant, a utility for creating and verifying digital certificates.
 ControlStrip, a daemon that controls the Touch Bar.
 CoreLocationAgent, a daemon responsible for displaying authorization prompts to allow apps and widgets to access location services.
 FolderActionsDispatcher, a daemon responsible for monitoring changes to the filesystem to run Folder Action scripts.
 Install Command Line Developer Tools, a utility that allows developers to easily install Xcode's command line developer tools if Xcode is not installed. It can be executed by running  in the terminal.
 Keychain Circle Notification, a daemon involved in iCloud Keychain syncing.
 ManagedClient manages various functions pertaining to managed preferences and configuration profiles.
 Setup Assistant is the application that starts on first boot of a fresh copy of macOS or a new Mac. It configures computer accounts, Apple ID, iCloud, and Accessibility settings. It is also run after major macOS system upgrades.
 OBEXAgent, a server that handles Bluetooth access.
 ODSAgent, a server that handles remote disk access.
 OSDUIHelper, a daemon that displays on-screen graphics when certain settings, such as volume or display brightness, or adjusted.
 PIPAgent, which manages the picture-in-picture feature available in macOS Sierra and later.
 Photo Library Migration Utility, which can migrate iPhoto and Aperture libraries to Photos.
 PowerChime, present on some MacBook models, plays a chime when the notebook is plugged in to power.
 ReportPanic, an app that displays a window when the system reboots from a kernel panic; it allows the user to send a report to Apple.
 screencaptureui, a daemon responsible for drawing the user interface shown when taking a screenshot.
 ScreenSaverEngine, the process that handles screen saver access. When invoked, it will display the screensaver.
 SystemUIServer, a daemon that manages status items in the menu bar.
 ThermalTrap, a daemon which notifies users when the system temperature exceeds a usable limit.
 Ticket Viewer, an app that displays Kerberos tickets.
 UnmountAssistantAgent, which displays a dialog if there is a process preventing ejection of a disk and offers to forcibly eject the disk if the process cannot be quit.
 Wireless Diagnostics, an app that launches when W-Fi connectivity problems are detected.

Older applications

Classic

The Classic Environment, usually referred to as Classic, is a hardware and software abstraction layer in PowerPC versions of Mac OS X that allows most legacy applications compatible with Mac OS 9 to run on Mac OS X. The name "Classic" is also sometimes used by software vendors to refer to the application programming interface available to "classic" applications, to differentiate between programming for Mac OS X and the classic version of the Mac OS.

The Classic Environment is supported on PowerPC-based Macintosh computers running versions of Mac OS X up to 10.4 "Tiger", but not with 10.5 "Leopard" or Macintoshes utilizing any other architecture than PowerPC.

The Classic Environment is a descendant of Rhapsody's "Blue Box" virtualization layer, which served as a proof of concept. (Previously, Apple A/UX also offered a virtualized Mac OS environment on top of a UNIX operating system.) It uses a Mac OS 9 System Folder, and a New World ROM file to bridge the differences between the older PowerPC Macintosh platforms and the XNU kernel environment. The Classic Environment was created as a key element of Apple's strategy to replace the classic Mac OS (versions 9 and below) with Mac OS X as the standard operating system (OS) used by Macintosh computers by eliminating the need to use the older OS directly.

The Classic Environment can be loaded at login (for faster activation when needed later), on command, or whenever a Mac OS application that requires it is launched (to reduce the use of system resources when not needed). It requires a full version of Mac OS 9 to be installed on the system, and loads an instance of that OS in a sandbox environment, replacing some low-level system calls with equivalent calls to Mac OS X via updated system files and the Classic Support system enabler. This sandbox is used to launch all "classic" Mac OS applications—there is only one instance of the Classic process running for a given user, and only one user per machine may be running Classic at a time.

If the user chooses to launch the Classic Environment only when needed, launching a "classic" application first launches the Classic Environment, which can be configured to appear in a window resembling the display of a computer booting into Mac OS 9. When the Classic Environment has finished loading, the application launches.  When a "classic" application is in the foreground, the menu bar at the top of the screen changes to look like the older Mac OS system menu. Dialog boxes and other user-interface elements retain their traditional appearance.

The Classic Environment provides a way to run "Classic" applications on Apple's G5 systems as well as on most G4 based computers sold after January 2003.  These machines cannot boot Mac OS 9 or earlier without the bridging capabilities of the Classic Environment or other software (see SheepShaver).

The Classic Environment's compatibility is usually sufficient for many applications, provided the application using it does not require direct access to hardware or engage in full-screen drawing. However, it is not a complete clone of Mac OS 9. The Finder included with Mac OS X v10.2 and later does not support the "Reveal Object" Apple events used by some Mac OS 9 applications, causing the "Reveal In Finder" functionality for those applications to be lost. Early releases of Mac OS X would often fail to draw window frames of Classic applications correctly, and after the Classic Environment's windowing was made double buffered in Mac OS X Panther, some older applications and games sometimes failed to update the screen properly, such as the original Macintosh port of Doom. However, the Classic Environment "resurrected" some older applications that had previously been unusable on the Macintosh Quadra and Power Macintosh series; this is because Mac OS X replaced Mac OS 9's virtual memory system with a more standard and less fragile implementation.

The Classic Environment's performance is also generally acceptable, with a few exceptions. Most of an application is run directly as PowerPC code (which would not be possible on Intel-based Macs). Motorola 68k code is handled by the same Motorola 68LC040 emulator that Mac OS 9 uses.  Some application functions are actually faster in the Classic Environment than under Mac OS 9 on equivalent hardware, due to performance improvements in the newer operating system's device drivers. These applications are largely those that use heavy disk processing, and were often quickly ported to Mac OS X by their developers. On the other hand, applications that rely on heavy processing and which did not share resources under Mac OS 9's co-operative multitasking model will be interrupted by other (non-Classic) processes under Mac OS X's preemptive multitasking.  The greater processing power of most systems that run Mac OS X (compared to systems intended to run Mac OS 8 or 9) helps to mitigate the performance degradation of the Classic Environment's virtualization.

Dashboard

Dashboard is an application for Apple Inc.'s macOS operating systems, used as a secondary desktop for hosting mini-applications known as widgets. These are intended to be simple applications that do not take time to launch. Dashboard applications supplied with macOS include a stock ticker, weather report, calculator and notepad; users can create or download their own. Before Mac OS X 10.7 Lion, when Dashboard is activated, the user's desktop is dimmed and widgets appear in the foreground. Like application windows, they can be moved around, rearranged, deleted, and recreated (so that more than one of the same Widget is open at the same time, possibly with different settings). New widgets can be opened, via an icon bar on the bottom of the layer, loading a list of available apps similar to the iOS homescreen or the macOS Launchpad. After loading, the widget is ready for use.

Dashboard was first introduced in Mac OS X 10.4 Tiger. It can be activated as an application, from the Dock, Launchpad or Spotlight. It can also be accessed by a dashboard key. Alternatively, the user can choose to make Dashboard open on moving the cursor into a preassigned hot corner or keyboard shortcut. Starting with Mac OS X 10.7 Lion, the Dashboard can be configured as a space, accessed by swiping four fingers to the right from the Desktops either side of it. In OS X 10.10 Yosemite, the Dashboard is disabled by default, as the Notification Center is now the primary method of displaying widgets.

Dashboard was removed in macOS Catalina.

Grab

Grab was a built-in utility for taking screenshots. It supported capturing a marquee selection, a whole window, or the whole screen, as well as timed screenshots. The program originated from NeXTSTEP, and was replaced by the Screenshot utility in macOS Mojave. Grab saved screenshots in the TIFF format. It was also possible to save screenshots in PDF format (earlier versions of macOS) or PNG format (later versions).

iDVD

iDVD is a discontinued DVD-creation application.

Internet Connect 
The Internet Connect program in Mac OS X allows the user to activate dial-up connections to the Internet via an ISP or VPN. It also provides a simple way to connect to an AirPort Network.  Up to the latest version of Mac OS X 10.4, the Internet Connect application provides more general tools than the more detailed Network pane in System Settings, which allows the user to configure and control systemwide network settings.  However, as of Mac OS X 10.5, Internet Connect's functions have been incorporated into the Network pane of System Settings, and the application is no longer included.

Use of Internet Connect is generally not necessary if the Macintosh is connected to the internet through an Ethernet device to DSL or cable internet service, except to manage connections to any subordinate bluetooth equipment.

iSync 

iSync was a tool made to sync iCal and Address Book data to a SyncML-enabled mobile phone, via Bluetooth or by using a USB connection. It was released on Jan 2, 2003, with technology licensed from fusionOne. Support for many (pre-October 2007) devices was built-in, with newer devices being supported via manufacturer and third-party iSync Plugins. Support for Palm OS organizers and compatible smartphones was removed with the release of iSync 3.1 and Mac OS X 10.6 Snow Leopard. BlackBerry OS, Palm OS, and Windows Mobile (Pocket PC) devices could not be used with iSync, but were supported by third-party applications. Before the release of Mac OS X 10.4, iSync also synchronized a user's Safari bookmarks with the then usable .Mac subscription service provided by Apple.

iTunes

iTunes is a media player, media library, Internet radio broadcaster, mobile device management utility, and the client app for iTunes Store. It is used to purchase, play, download, and organize digital multimedia, on personal computers running the macOS and Windows operating systems. iTunes is developed by Apple Inc. It was announced on January 9, 2001.

Because iTunes was criticized for having a bloated user experience, Apple decided to split iTunes into separate apps as of macOS Catalina: Apple Music, Apple Podcasts, and Apple TV. Finder would take over the device management aspect that iTunes previously served. This change would not affect Windows or older macOS versions.

Network Utility
Network Utility was an application for macOS up to MacOS Catalina that provided a variety of tools that could be used related to computer network information gathering and analysis. Starting with macOS Big Sur the application is no longer included and was replaced with a message that it has been deprecated. Starting with macOS Ventura, the application is removed from the OS.

Network Utility showed information about each of your network connections, including the MAC address of the interface, the IP address assigned to it, its speed and status, a count of data packets sent and received, and a count of transmission errors and collisions. It also provided a GUI to the netstat, ping, traceroute, whois, finger, and stroke UNIX programs.

ODBC Administrator

ODBC Administrator was a 32-bit utility in the Mac OS X operating system for administering ODBC, which enables interaction with ODBC-compliant data sources.  Features included connection pooling, trace log creation, and ODBC driver management, among other administration features.

Although Apple started including the underlying iODBC libraries in Mac OS X Jaguar, and continued to do so through at least macOS Big Sur, Apple only included their ODBC Administrator through Mac OS X Leopard, and temporarily made it available as a separate download (since removed) for Snow Leopard.

Alternatives to Apple's 32-bit ODBC Administrator include the free and open source 32-bit and 64-bit iODBC Administrator included with the iODBC SDK, which is available for all extant versions of Mac OS X (10.0.x through 11.2.x).

Remote Install Mac OS X 

Remote Install Mac OS X was a remote installer for use with MacBook Air laptops over the network. It could run on a Mac or a Windows PC with an optical drive. A client MacBook Air (lacking an optical drive) could then wirelessly connect to the other Mac or PC to perform system software installs.

Remote Install Mac OS X was released as part of Mac OS X 10.5.2 on February 12, 2008. Support for the Mac mini was added in March 2009, allowing the DVD drive to be replaced with a second hard drive.

With the launch of Mac OS X Lion, Apple has omitted Remote Install. A workaround is to enable Target Disk Mode.

Sherlock

Sherlock, named after fictional detective Sherlock Holmes, is a file and web search tool created by Apple Inc. for the PowerPC-based "classic" Mac OS, introduced with Mac OS 8 as an extension of the Mac OS Finder's file searching capabilities. Like its predecessor (System 7.5's totally revamped 'Find File' app, adapted by Bill Monk from his 'Find Pro' shareware find program[1]), Sherlock searches for local files and file contents, using the same basic indexing code and search logic found in AppleSearch. Sherlock extended the system by enabling the user to search for items through the World Wide Web through a set of plugins which employed existing web search engines. These plugins were written as plain text files, so that it was a simple task for a user to write a Sherlock plugin. Since most of the standard plug-ins for Sherlock provided by Apple itself no longer function, it was officially retired and removed in the release of Mac OS X 10.5 Leopard in 2007.

Software Update
In Mac OS 9 and early versions of Mac OS X, Software Update was a standalone tool. The program was part of the CoreServices in OS X. It could automatically inform users of new updates (with new features and bug and security fixes) to the operating system, applications, device drivers, and firmware. All updates required the user to enter their administrative password and some required a system restart.  It could be set to check for updates daily, weekly, monthly, or not at all; in addition, it could download and store the associated .pkg file (the same type used by Installer) to be installed at a later date, and it maintained a history of installed updates. Starting with Mac OS X 10.5 Leopard, updates that required a reboot logged out the user prior to installation and automatically restarted the computer when complete. In earlier versions of OS X, the updates were installed, but critical files were not replaced until the next system startup.

Beginning with OS X 10.8, Software Update became part of the App Store application. Beginning with macOS Mojave (10.14), it became a part of System preferences.

X11

In Mac OS X Tiger, X11 was an optional install included on the install DVD. Mac OS X Leopard, Snow Leopard and Lion installed X11 by default, but from OS X Mountain Lion (10.8), Apple dropped dedicated support for X11, with users directed to the open source XQuartz project (to which it contributes) instead.

Development tools

Server technology

Core components

 AppleScript
 Aqua
 Audio Units
 Bonjour
 Boot Camp
 Carbon
 Cocoa
 Core Animation
 Core Audio
 Core Data
 Core Image
 Core Video
 Darwin
 Mission Control
 Keychain
 OpenGL
 plist
 Quartz
 QuickTime
 Rosetta
 Smart folder
 Spaces
 WebKit
 XNU

Notes

References

components
macOS components